Speleketor is a genus of large-winged psocids in the family Prionoglarididae. There are at least three described species in Speleketor, found in the southwestern United States.

Species
These three species belong to the genus Speleketor:
 Speleketor flocki Gurney, 1943
 Speleketor irwini Mockford, 1984
 Speleketor pictus Mockford, 1984

References

Trogiomorpha
Insect genera